Lead Me On is the third studio album by British singer Maxine Nightingale. It peaked at number 45 on the Billboard Top LPs & Tape chart and at number 35 on the R&B albums chart. In the UK, the album had a different track listing and was titled Love Lines.

Track listing
Side one
"Hideaway" (R. Ellison, P. Brown) – 5:55
"(Bringing Out) The Girl in Me" (Ray Parker Jr.) – 3:30
"Darlin' Dear"  (Pam Sawyer, Marilyn McLeod) – 3:06
"Love Me Like You Mean It" (Parker Jr.) – 3:02

Side two
"Lead Me On" (Allee Willis, David Lasley) – 2:45
"You Got to Me" (Len Boone) – 3:08
"Ask Billy (They Tell Me)" (Leroy Bell, Casey James) – 2:59
"You Are the Most Important Person in Your Life" (Sawyer, McLeod) – 3:09
 untitled hidden track – 4:07

Charts

References

1978 albums
Maxine Nightingale albums